Locarno Ballrooms were a series of large public ballrooms located in England and Scotland and were represented in most major British cities.

History

The company was created in 1926 and named after the Locarno treaties of 1925 which offered a new hope and spirit in post-war Europe (created in Locarno in Switzerland). Given the company's development pattern it was presumably Scots-owned.

Many earlier buildings were adaptations of cinemas, which despite the growing success of cinemas were generally over-provided. The demand in these pre-sound days was for smaller and more widely distributed cinemas and some of the bigger venues struggled. The smaller cinemas were in turn hit by the advent of sound films, and many did not survive this expensive transition.

The first Locarno was created in 1926 on Sauchiehall Street in Glasgow, in the shell of the Charing Cross Electric Cinema, Glasgow's first purpose built cinema. This was designed by Robert Duncan in 1898 with a cast iron structure but with a traditional stone frontage with high numbers of large windows (certainly more glazing than a typical cinema of the day). The original full title was the "Locarno Palais de Dance". Functionally the buildings focussed on what would now be called ballroom dancing and the locations provided both professional displays plus instruction classes. The Glasgow venue was home to Scotland's first Scottish Professional Dancing Championships in 1928.

The chain and brand name was mainly acquired by Mecca Leisure Group  in the mid 1960s but they retained the much-loved name Locarno in most locations. Under Mecca many also gained a function as a performance venue. Several venues were particularly associated with Northern Soul.

Sadly most venues were closed prior to the revival of ballroom dancing in the UK with the beginning of Strictly Come Dancing in 2004, which potentially could have breathed new life into the venues. The main presenter Len Goodman learnt his craft in the Streatham Locarno.

The first Locarno, that on Sauchiehall Street in Glasgow, still exists: both in its external form and as the main auditorium of The Garage, Glasgow, Scotland's biggest nightclub. The building is a category B listed building due to its architectural and cultural significance (LB33197).

Locations
Glasgow (1926) renamed Tiffany's in 1962 when use changed to a discotheque. the building still survives at 508 Sauchiehall St and forms part of The Garage, Glasgow
Dundee (1927?) closed 1951
Streatham (1929) renamed 1970 as the Cat's Whiskers, demolished 2004
Montrose (c.1930) closed 1950s
Aberdeen (acquired and rebranded Locarno c. 1932) closed 1955 demolished 1979
Edinburgh (1934) snooker halls only
Leeds (1938)
Liverpool( 1948)
Swindon (1952)
Coventry (1960) renamed Tiffany's soon after, closed 1981
Sunderland (Newcastle) (c.1960) major gig venue
Birmingham (1961)
Basildon (1961)
Burnley (1962)
Bristol(1966) mainly as a gig venue, closed 1983 reopened as O2 Academy Bristol

In Popular culture
Several Locarnos were the siting of "Come Dancing" in the 1960s and 70s.

The Coventry band The Specials refer to their local Locarno in their hit "Friday Night and Saturday Morning" (also covered by the French band Nouvelle Vague).

In Dundee, the site of the Locarno is remembered in the street name Locarno Close.

References

Ballroom dance
Nightclubs in Scotland
Music venues in Scotland
1926 establishments in Scotland